Pulaski County is a county in the U.S. state of Arkansas. With a population of 399,125 as of the 2020 United States Census, it is the most populous county in Arkansas. The county is included in the Little Rock–North Little Rock–Conway metropolitan area. Its county seat is Little Rock, which is also Arkansas's capital and largest city.

Pulaski County is Arkansas's fifth county, formed on December 15, 1818, alongside Clark and Hempstead Counties. Pulaski County is named for Brigadier General Casimir Pulaski, a Polish-born Continental Army officer who was killed in action at the Siege of Savannah during the Revolutionary War. The county was the site of the Battle of Bayou Fourche on September 10, 1863. The Union army took control the same day and occupied Pulaski County until the end of the Civil War. The county was home to Willow Springs Water Park, one of the oldest water parks in the nation, which opened in 1928 and closed in 2013.

Geography

Major highways

 U.S. Highway 65
 U.S. Highway 67
 U.S. Highway 70
 U.S. Highway 165
 U.S. Highway 167
 Highway 5
 Highway 10
 Highway 100
 Highway 161
 Highway 300
 Highway 338
 Highway 365
 Highway 367

Adjacent counties
Faulkner County (north)
Lonoke County (east)
Grant County (south)
Jefferson County (south)
Saline County (west)
Perry County (northwest)

National protected areas
 Little Rock Central High School National Historic Site

Demographics

2020 census

As of the 2020 United States census, there were 399,125 people, 158,000 households, and 93,080 families residing in the county.

2000 census
As of the 2000 United States Census, there were 361,474 people, 147,942 households, and 95,718 families residing in the county. There were 161,135 housing units at an average density of 209 per square mile (81/km2). The racial makeup of the county was 63.96% White, 31.87% Black or African American, 0.39% Native American, 1.25% Asian, 0.04% Pacific Islander, 1.09% from other races, and 1.40% from two or more races.  2.44% of the population were Hispanic or Latino of any race.

There were 147,942 households, out of which 30.50% had children under the age of 18 living with them, 45.90% were married couples living together, 15.10% had a female householder with no husband present, and 35.30% were non-families. 30.00% of all households were made up of individuals, and 8.80% had someone living alone who was 65 years of age or older.  The average household size was 2.39 and the average family size was 2.98.

In the county, the population was spread out, with 25.20% under the age of 18, 9.60% from 18 to 24, 31.10% from 25 to 44, 22.60% from 45 to 64, and 11.50% who were 65 years of age or older.  The median age was 35 years. For every 100 females, there were 92.00 males.  For every 100 females age 18 and over, there were 88.20 males.

The median income for a household in the county was $38,120, and the median income for a family was $46,523. Males had a median income of $33,131 versus $25,943 for females. The per capita income for the county was $21,466.  About 10.40% of families and 13.30% of the population were below the poverty line, including 19.90% of those under age 18 and 9.80% of those age 65 or over.

Government and infrastructure

The Arkansas Department of Correction Wrightsville Unit is in Wrightsville.

Politics
Pulaski County is one of the most Democratic counties in Arkansas and the Southern United States. The city of North Little Rock was ranked the most liberal community in the state. 

In the Reconstruction Era following the Civil War, Republicans carried the county in every presidential election from 1868 to 1888. Since then, Republicans have only won the county four times: 1956, 1972, 1984, and 1988, all national Republican landslides.

Pulaski County has followed in the footsteps of most urban counties across the country, especially in the era of Barack Obama's presidency and post-presidency that has seen urban areas turn bluer and rural areas, such as virtually all of Arkansas, get even redder and more conservative. Donald Trump, the two-time winner of the state with over 60% of the vote, only garnered about 38% in this county, among his worst performances in a state that has strongly turned against the Democrats in the 21st century. Joe Biden's 59.9% share in 2020 is the highest for a Democrat in the county since 1976, besting even native son Bill Clinton in both 1992 and 1996.

Education
 Tertiary
 Pulaski Technical College is a two-year community college and technical school that offers seven locations throughout the county, including a flagship campus in western North Little Rock.
 Four-year postsecondary institutions include the University of Arkansas at Little Rock, the University of Arkansas System's only metropolitan campus, the United Methodist Church-affiliated Philander Smith College, Arkansas Baptist College, and the University of Arkansas for Medical Sciences — all located in Little Rock.

School districts include:
 Jacksonville North Pulaski School District
 Little Rock School District
 North Little Rock School District
 Pulaski County Special School District
 East End School District

 State-operated schools
 Arkansas School for the Blind
 Arkansas School for the Deaf

Communities

Cities
Cammack Village
Jacksonville
Little Rock (county seat)
Maumelle
North Little Rock
Sherwood
Wrightsville

Town
Alexander

Census-designated places

 College Station
 Gibson
 Hensley
 Landmark
 McAlmont
 Natural Steps
 Roland
 Scott
 Sweet Home
 Woodson

Other communities
 Crystal Hill
 Gravel Ridge
 Ironton
 Little Italy
 Mabelvale
 Marche
 Pankey
 Woodyardville

Townships
Townships in Arkansas are the divisions of a county. Each township includes unincorporated areas and some may have incorporated towns or cities within part of their space. Townships have limited purposes in modern times. However, the US Census does list Arkansas population based on townships (often referred to as "minor civil divisions"). Townships are also of value for historical purposes in terms of genealogical research. Each town or city is within one or more townships in an Arkansas county based on census maps. Pulaski County only has two townships, as of 2010.  They are listed below.

Notable people
 
 
Granville Ryles (1831-1909), minister, farmer and state legislator in Arkansas

See also

 List of lakes in Pulaski County, Arkansas
 National Register of Historic Places listings in Pulaski County, Arkansas

References

External links
Pulaski County Government
 Pulaski County, Arkansas in Encyclopedia of Arkansas

 
Arkansas counties
1818 establishments in Missouri Territory
Populated places established in 1818
Little Rock–North Little Rock–Conway metropolitan area
Majority-minority counties in Arkansas